Batterbee may refer to:
 Harry Batterbee (1880–1976), British civil servant and diplomat
 Cape Batterbee, Enderby Land, Antarctica